Frank Sutton (April 1930 – July 16, 2020) was an American politician. He served as a Democratic member for the 9th district of the Georgia State Senate.

Life and career 
Sutton was born in Colquitt County, Georgia, the son of Martha Baker and J. Y. Sutton. He attended Abraham Baldwin Agricultural College and the University of Georgia.

In 1971, Sutton was elected to represent the 9th district of the Georgia State Senate. He served until 1983, when he was succeeded by R. T. Phillips.

Sutton died in July 2020, at the age of 90.

References 

1930 births
2020 deaths
People from Colquitt County, Georgia
Democratic Party Georgia (U.S. state) state senators
20th-century American politicians
University of Georgia alumni